Tabaung is the twelfth and final month of the traditional Burmese calendar.

Festivals and observances
Tabaung Festival (Magha Puja) - full moon of Tabaung
Sand Pagoda Festival
28 Pagoda Parade Festival, Pyinmana Township
Pagoda festivals
Shwedagon Pagoda Festival
Alaungdaw Kathapa Pagoda Festival, Sagaing Region
Shwesettaw Pagoda Festival, Minbu Township, Magwe Region
Shwesayan Pagoda Festival (Patheingyi Township, Mandalay Region)

Tabaung symbols
Flower: Calophyllum amoenum

References

See also
Burmese calendar
Festivals of Burma

Months of the Burmese calendar